The Silesian University of Technology (Polish name: Politechnika Śląska) is a university located in the Polish province of Silesia, with most of its facilities in the city of Gliwice. It was founded in 1945 by Polish professors of the Lwow Polytechnic, who were forced to leave their native city and move to the Recovered Territories (see also Kresy). In 2021, the prestigious Perspektywy Foundation ranked it as 6th best University of Technology in Poland and 13th overall.

Organization
Silesian University of Technology is organized into 13 faculties, 1 college and 1 research institute:
Faculty of Architecture, 
Faculty of Automatic Control, Electronics and Computer Science, 
Faculty of Civil Engineering, 
Faculty of Chemistry, 
Faculty of Electrical Engineering,
Faculty of Mining and Geology, 
Faculty of Biomedical Engineering
Faculty of Materials Engineering and Metallurgy, 
Faculty of Energy and Environmental Engineering, 
Faculty of Applied Mathematics, 
Faculty of Mechanical Engineering, 
Faculty of Organization and Management, 
Faculty of Transport,
College of Social Sciences and Foreign Philologies,
Institute of Physics - Centre for Science and Education

Eleven of these are situated in Gliwice, two in Katowice and two in Zabrze.

Affiliations

The university is affiliated with the following organizations:
 European University Association (EUA)
 European Society for Engineering Education (SEFI)
 The Innovation Cluster for Entrepreneurship Education of the Erasmus+ Programme
 Alliance of Universities for Democracy (AUDEM)
 Trans-European Mobility Programme for University Studies (TEMPUS)
 Erasmus Programme which evolved into the Socrates programme
 Leonardo da Vinci programme
  Central European Exchange Program for University Studies (CEEPUS)
 Index Copernicus
 European Cooperation in Science and Technology (COST)
 The EUREKA intergovernmental organization

References

External links
 Silesian University of Technology homepage
 Official website (polish version)

Gliwice
Universities and colleges in Poland
Universities and colleges in Katowice
Educational institutions established in 1945
1945 establishments in Poland